The Dragões vs Leões fixture between FC Porto and Sporting CP is one of the most important football matches in Portugal.

In 1922, the first Campeonato de Portugal, the forerunner to today's Taça de Portugal, was decided in a best-of-three series between Porto and Sporting, ultimately won by Porto (the Algarve and Madeira FA winners were also scheduled to participate but could not attend the tournament due to logistical issues). Thereafter, there have been five other finals between the two teams, this time after more participants had been eliminated. The clubs have also met in the league continuously since 1934 and in other cup fixtures.

All-time head-to-head results

Honours
These are the major football honours of Porto and Sporting CP.

League matches
The matches listed below are only Primeira Liga matches, club name in bold indicates win. The score is given at full-time, and in the goals columns, the goalscorer and time when goal was scored is noted.

Head-to-head results

Taça de Portugal matches
The matches listed below are only Taça de Portugal matches, club name in bold indicates win. The score is given at full-time; in the goals columns, the goalscorer and time when goal was scored is noted.

Head-to-head results

Taça da Liga matches
The matches listed below are only Taça da Liga matches; club name in bold indicates win. The score is given at full-time; in the goals columns, the goalscorer and time when goal was scored is noted.

Head-to-head results

Supertaça Cândido de Oliveira matches
The matches listed below are only Supertaça Cândido de Oliveira matches; club name in bold indicates win. The score is given at full-time; in the goals columns, the goalscorer and time when goal was scored is noted.

Head-to-head results

Campeonato de Portugal matches 
The matches listed below are only Campeonato de Portugal matches. The Campeonato de Portugal was created in 1922 and was the primary tournament in Portugal, where all teams competed from around the country. In 1938, the Campeonato de Portugal became what is now known as the Taça de Portugal. The club name in bold indicates win. The score is given at full-time and half-time (in brackets), and in the goals columns, the goalscorer and time when goal was scored is noted.

Head-to-head results

Players who played for both clubs

  Vianinha 
  Osvaldo da Silva 
  Armando Manhiça 
  Manuel Duarte 
  Armando Luís 
  Fernando Peres 
  Joaquim Dinis 
  Carlos Alhinho 
  Ailton 
  António Vaz 
  António Oliveira 
  Augusto Inácio 
  Eurico Gomes 
  Gabriel 
  Romeu Silva 
  António Sousa 
  Luís Matos 
  Ademar Marques 
  Jaime Pacheco 
  Paulo Futre 
  Paulinho Cascavel 
  Jorge Plácido 
  António Morato 
  Fernando Gomes 
  Fernando Mendes 
  Paulo Costinha 
  Emílio Peixe 
  Rui Correia 
  Capucho 
  Rui Jorge 
  Fernando Nélson 
  Edmílson 
  Bino 
  Mário Jardel 
  Nuno Valente 
  Clayton 
  Ricardo Fernandes 
  Ricardo Quaresma 
  João Paulo 
  Carlos Paredes 
  Derlei 
  Hélder Postiga 
  Beto 
  Silvestre Varela 
  João Moutinho 
  Maniche 
  Pedro Mendes 
  Evaldo 
  Nuno André Coelho 
  Hugo Ventura 
  Miguel Lopes 
  Marat Izmailov 
  Liédson

Managers who managed both clubs

  József Szabó 
  Cândido de Oliveira 
  Alejandro Scopelli 
  Fernando Vaz 
  Otto Glória 
  Fernando Riera 
  António Morais 
  Bobby Robson 
  António Oliveira 
  Octávio Machado 
  Fernando Santos 
  José Couceiro 
  Jesualdo Ferreira 
  José Peseiro

See also 

 O Clássico
 Derby de Lisboa
 List of association football club rivalries in Europe

References

External links
Sporting C.P. Official Website 
FC Porto Official Website 

Porto Sporting
FC Porto
Sporting CP